The Multimedia Collection in the Legacy Tobacco Documents Library at the University of California, San Francisco contains more than 7,500 tobacco industry video and audio tapes including recordings of focus groups, internal corporate meetings, depositions of tobacco industry employees, Congressional hearings, corporate communications, and commercials. Funded by a grant from the California Tobacco Related Disease Research Program (TRDRP), UCSF Library staff collects multimedia materials housed at the Minnesota Tobacco Documents Depository, Roswell Park Comprehensive Cancer Center, and Guildford depository in the UK.

Many of these videos and audio recordings have been uploaded to the UCSF Tobacco Industry Videos and Audio Recordings Collection at the Internet Archive and are available to researchers and the general public.

External links
 UCSF Tobacco Industry Videos Collection
 UCSF Tobacco Industry Audio Recordings Collection
 Legacy Tobacco Documents Library (LTDL)
 British American Tobacco Documents Archive
 UCSF Tobacco Control Archives

Tobacco advertising
Smoking in the United States
Business and industry archives
Tobacco in the United States
University of California, San Francisco